Tarło (Plural: Tarłowie) was a Polish magnate (szlachta) family. The seats of the family in the 16th century were, among others: Laszki Murowane near Chyrów, Sambor, Dębowiec near Jasło, Samoklęski and Potok near Krosno.

Coat of arms

The family used the Topór coat of arms.

Notable members

 Adam Tarło (1713–1744) – voivode of Lublin Voivodship, rotmistrz pancerny
 Adam Tarło (1708–1772) – general
 Adam Tarło (died 1710) – voivode of Smoleńsk Voivodship
 Adam Tarło (died 1719) – voivode of Lublin Voividship
 Andrzej Tarło (died 1531) – chorąży of Lwów
 Anna Tarło – wife of Hieronim Chodkiewicz
 Aleksander Tarło (1639–1683) – castelan of Zawichojsk
 Barbara Tarło, (c.1636–1689) – wife of Jerzy Sebastian Lubomirski
 Jadwiga Tarło – wife of Hieronim Jarosz Sieniawski
 Jadwiga Tarło (c. 1560–1614) – wife of Jerzy Mniszech, mother of Maryna Mniszchówna Tsarina of Russia
 Jan Joachim Tarło (1658–1732) – Bishop of Kijów (Kyiv, also Kiev) and Poznań
 Jan Kanty Tarło (1790–1855) – owner of Sułkowice and Zalesie
 Jan Karol Tarło, (c. 1593–1645) – castellan of Wiślice and starost of Olsztyn and Zwoleń
 Jan Tarło (?-1572) – chorąży of Lwów
 Jan Tarło (died 1550) – cześnik of the Crown and Podczaszy of the Crown 
 Jan Tarło (1527–1587 – voivode of Lublin Voivodeship
 Jan Tarło (1684–1750) – voivode of Lublin Voivodeship and of Sandomierz Voivodeship
 Katarzyna Tarło (c.1535 – c.1582) – mother of voivode of Ruthenian Voivodship Jan Daniłowicz
 Karol Tarło (1639–1702) – podkanclerzy koronny, voivode of Lublin Voivodeship
 Mikołaj Tarło (died 1578) – courtier
 Mikołaj Tarło (died 1571) – secretary of the Kind, podczaszy of Queen Barbara Radziwiłł
 Mikołaj Bartłomiej Tarło (died 1716) – Bishop of Poznań
 Paweł Tarło (died 1565) – canon of Kraków and Archbishop Lwów
 Paweł Tarło (died 1553) – magistrate of Lwów
 Paweł Tarło (died 1722) – canon of Gnieźno, Poznań, Kraków, Bishop of Livonia and Poznań
 Piotr Aleksander Tarło (c. 1565–1649) – castelan of Lublin,  voivode of Lublin Voivodeship
 Stanisław Tarło (1480–1544) – secretary of King Zygmunt I Stary, Bishop of Przemyśl
 Stanisław Tarło (died 1530) – ochmistrz of Queen Elżbieta
 Stanisław Tarło (1639–1705) – voivode of Lublin Voivodeship
 Stanisław Tarło (died 1599/1601) – starost of Sochaczew and Zwoleń
 Teofilia Tarło (c. 1595–1635) – wife of Janusz Ostrogski
 Zaklika Tarło ze  Szczekarzewic (died 1465/66) – Krajczy of the Crown, envoy of King Władysław II Jagiełło
 Zygmunt Tarło (c. 1561–1628) – Chorąży of Przemyśl

Palaces

References

 Mieczysław Orłowicz: Przewodnik po Lwowie. Lwów: 1925 (rep. Wyd. Roksana, 2000), s. 256. .
 Słownik geograficzny Królestwa Polskiego